The Big Half is an annual road running competition over the half marathon distance (21.1 km), held in central London, United Kingdom. The event usually takes place in early March, a few weeks before the London Marathon. The competition attracts both mass and elite participation. Mo Farah and Charlotte Purdue are both three-time winners of the event.

Editions

See also 
 List of half marathon races

References

External links
 Official website

Half marathons in the United Kingdom
Athletics in London
Athletics competitions in England
2017 establishments in England
Recurring sporting events established in 2017
Annual sporting events in the United Kingdom
Annual events in England